Events from the year 1661 in Denmark.

Incumbents
 Monarch – Frederick III

Events

 January 10 – The decision to introduce absolute monarchy from the previous year enters into effect.
 January 12 – The State College proposes a comprehensive codification of Danish law, later resulting in the Danish Code of 1683.
 January – The Royal Horse Guards is founded. It is discontinued in 1866.
 February 14 – The Supreme Court of Denmark is established.
 April 16 – Joachim Gersdorff dies suddenly, giving rise to rumours that he has been poisoned. His wife Øllegaard Huitfeld and a maidservant are convicted of murder.
 April 24 – Auctions are first authorized in Copenhagen and an auction master is engaged.
 May 7 – A tax on marriage is introduced (the so-called kopulationspenge)
 June 4 – The so-called Demarcation Line around Copenhagen is introduced when it is prohibited to build in the zone between the city's Fortification Ring and The Lakes.
 June 24 – The Coat of arms of Copenhagen is granted to the city by the king in appraisal of its citizens' efforts in repelling the Swedish siege and attack on the city the previous year. An accompanying royal letter of privilege also introduced various privileges which, however remained of relatively minor importance. The city is also granted the fief Roskilde (Bidstrup estate).* September – Corfitz Ulfeldt and Leonora Christina are released from their imprisonment at Hammershus on the island of Bornholm.

Undated
 Market towns are given a monopoly on trade and crafts.
 Møgeltønderhus is granted to Count Hans von Schack who demolishes most of it and builds the current Schackenborg Castle.
 Fort Frederiksborg is built on the Danish Gold Coast.

Births
 none known

Deaths
 April 19 – Joachim Gersdorff, Steward of the Realm (b. 1611)

References

 
Denmark
Years of the 17th century in Denmark